This is a list of monuments in Sarlahi District, Nepal as officially recognized by and available through the website of the Department of Archaeology, Nepal.

Sarlahi is a district of Province No. 2 bordered to the west with Bagmati River. The Ancient Monument Protection Act of Nepal 1956 has defined monuments as structure older than 100 years and having historical, cultural importance. According to Nepal Census 2011 about 85.56% people follow Hindu religion in this district. So as the population the monumental sites of this district is dominated by Hindu temples and shrines. Among all the monuments Murtiya is a ruin of unidentified temple.

List of monuments

|}

See also 
 List of monuments in Province No. 2
 List of monuments in Nepal

References 

Sarlahi
Sarlahi District